The Commander-in-Chief of the Pakistan Army (abbreviation: C-in-C of the Pakistan Army) was the professional head of the Pakistan Army from 1947 to 1972. The C-in-C was directly responsible for commanding the army. It was an administrative position and the appointment holder had main operational command authority over the army.

Direct appointments to the command of the Pakistan Army came from the British Army Council until 1951, when the first native Pakistani commander-in-chief (General Ayub Khan) was nominated and appointed by the Government of Pakistan.

The C-in-C designation was changed to 'Chief of Army Staff' in 1972, General Tikka Khan was the first person to hold the new title. Six generals have served as C-in-C, the first two of them were native British and the post's name was derived from the post of Commander-in-Chief of the British Indian Army.

History

Prior to the Creation of Pakistan from the Partition of India on 14 August 1947, the senior generals of the British Indian Army were appointments made by the Army Council (1904) of the British Army.

The supreme military commander's appointment was known as Commander-in-Chief, India who directly reported to the Governor-General of India who was also under the British monarchy. Field Marshal Sir Claude Auchinleck was the last Commander-in-Chief of the undivided British Indian Army who became the supreme commander of India and Pakistan on 15 August 1947 serving till November 30 of that year.

Dominion of Pakistan was born in 14 August in 1947 and it's army was known as 'Royal Pakistan Army'; on 15 August British Indian Army's General Frank Messervy became the first C-in-C of the newly created Pakistan Army. General Ayub Khan was the first native Pakistani to hold the appointment in 17 January 1951. However, Ayub didn't hold the substantive rank of full general till 1957.

In 1969, when General Yahya Khan became President of Pakistan, Lieutenant General Abdul Hamid Khan was promoted to full General and was appointed as the 'Chief of Staff of the Army'. On 20 March 1972, the commander-in-chief post was renamed as "Chief of Army Staff (COAS)" with Lieutenant-General Tikka Khan elevated to four star rank to be appointed as army's first chief of army staff; this renaming was done copying India's COAS appointment.

The term of the superannuation was then constrained to three years in office as opposed to four years and was made a permanent member of the Joint Chiefs of Staff Committee.

Appointees
The following table chronicles the appointees to the office of the Commander-in-Chief since the independence of Pakistan to 1972.

Commanders-in-Chief, Pakistan Army (1947–1972)

Responsibility
The responsibility of the C-in-C was to perform as the chief commander of the army, he was responsible to make army and war policies along with other senior generals. He had the main command authority over the army. It was also the responsibility of the general to preside over the formation commanders meeting and any other meeting in the General Headquarters.

Chief of Staff of the Army

The C-in-Cs were assisted by Chiefs of Staff (COS), as prior to the birth of Pakistan, the GHQ, Pakistan was an army command's HQ of the British Indian Army (the Northern Command, India) and there had been the appointment of the Chief of Staff under the command's commander, this trend continued in independent Pakistan's newly created army headquarters. The last Chief of Staff was General Abdul Hamid Khan, who served till 1971. Another noted chief of staff was Lieutenant General Nasir Ali Khan in 1950s.

Senior commanders during the 1965 and 1971 Wars

During the 1965 Indo-Pakistani War, there were only two Lt. Gens in the Army; Bakhtiar Rana, the Commander I Corps, and Altaf Qadri, who was on deputation to CENTO, Turkey, and a handful of Maj. Gens.

During the 1971 Indo-Pakistani War, there were two full generals and the number of Lt Gens reached 13; four were posted at the GHQ/CMLA HQ, one at the CENTO HQ in Ankara, Turkey, four were corps commanders,  four were governors under martial law. General Yahya Khan was the President of Pakistan, General Abdul Hamid Khan was the de facto Commander-in-Chief of the Army, Lt Gen S.G.M.M. Peerzada was the PSO CMLA HQ in Rawalpindi, Lt Gen Gul Hassan Khan was the Chief of General Staff (CGS), and Lt Gen Khwaja Wasiuddin was the Master-General of Ordnance (MGO).The GHQ posts of QMG and AG were under the rank of Major-Generals. Lt Gen Muhammad Shariff was sent as the Permanent Representative to the CENTO HQ in Turkey. Army's Eastern Command was under Lt Gen A.A.K. Niazi, I Corps was under Lt Gen Irshad Ahmad Khan, II Corps was under Lt Gen Tikka Khan, IV Corps was under Lt Gen Bahadur Sher. On the other hand, the governor of Punjab was Lt Gen Attiqur Rahman, the governor of Sindh was Lt Gen Rakhman Gul, the governor of NWFP was Lt Gen K.M. Azhar, and the governor of Balochistan was Lt Gen Riaz Hussain.

References

Commanders-in-Chief, Pakistan Army